Harry Whiddon (20 November 1878 – 19 December 1935) was an Australian cricketer. He played three first-class matches for New South Wales in 1907/08.

See also
 List of New South Wales representative cricketers

References

External links
 

1878 births
1935 deaths
Australian cricketers
New South Wales cricketers
Cricketers from Sydney